Monaeses is a genus of crab spiders in the family Thomisidae, containing twenty seven species.

Species
 Monaeses aciculus (Simon, 1903) — Nepal to Japan, Philippines
 Monaeses attenuatus O. P.-Cambridge, 1899 — Sri Lanka
 Monaeses austrinus Simon, 1910 — West, Southern Africa
 Monaeses brevicaudatus L. Koch, 1874 — Queensland
 Monaeses caudatus Tang & Song, 1988 — China
 Monaeses cinerascens (Thorell, 1887) — Sri Lanka, Myanmar
 Monaeses fasciculiger Jezequel, 1964 — Ivory Coast
 Monaeses fuscus Dippenaar-Schoeman, 1984 — South Africa
 Monaeses gibbus Dippenaar-Schoeman, 1984 — South Africa
 Monaeses greeni O. P.-Cambridge, 1899 — Sri Lanka
 Monaeses griseus Pavesi, 1897 — Ethiopia to South Africa
 Monaeses guineensis Millot, 1942 — Guinea
 Monaeses habamatinikus Barrion & Litsinger, 1995 — Philippines
 Monaeses israeliensis Levy, 1973 — Greece, Turkey, Israel, Lebanon, Central Asia
 Monaeses jabalpurensis Gajbe & Rane, 1992 — India
 Monaeses lucasi (Taczanowski, 1872) — Guyana
 Monaeses mukundi Tikader, 1980 — India
 Monaeses nigritus Simon, 1909 — Vietnam
 Monaeses pachpediensis (Tikader, 1980) — India
 Monaeses paradoxus (Lucas, 1846) — Europe to Azerbaijan, Africa
 Monaeses parvati Tikader, 1963 — India
 Monaeses pustulosus Pavesi, 1895 — Ethiopia to South Africa
 Monaeses quadrituberculatus Lawrence, 1927 — Southern Africa
 Monaeses reticulatus (Simon, 1909) — Vietnam
 Monaeses tuberculatus (Thorell, 1895) — Myanmar
 Monaeses xiphosurus Simon, 1907 — Guinea-Bissau
 Monaeses xyphoides L. Koch, 1874 — Queensland

References

Thomisidae
Thomisidae genera
Spiders of Asia
Spiders of Australia
Spiders of Africa
Taxa named by Tamerlan Thorell